The 2017 Liga 3 East Java (also known as Liga 3 Kapal Api Jawa Timur for sponsorship reason) is the third edition of Liga 3 East Java as a qualifying round for the national round of 2017 Liga 3. Blitar United are the defending champions.

The competition scheduled starts on May 3, 2017.

Teams
There are 41 clubs which will participate the league in this season.

Groups

Round 2

Semifinal
All matches was played in Brawijaya Stadium, Kediri City

MATCH 1

Deltras Sidoarjo  (1 - 2)  Blitar United

MATCH 2

Persibo Bojonegoro  (2 - 0)  Persekabpas Pasuruan

3rd Place
Match is played in Brawijaya Stadium, Kediri City on Sept 30th 2017

Deltras Sidoarjo  (2 - 0)  Persekabpas Pasuruan

Final
Match is played in Brawijaya Stadium, Kediri City on Sept 30th 2017

Blitar United  1(3) - 1(1)  Persibo Bojonegoro

Qualified teams for National round
East Java was given 3 representative to the National round and 2 representative to Play-off round

 3 teams to National round :

 2 teams to Play-off round:

References 

2017 in Indonesian football
Sport in East Java
East Java